Under Glass is the second studio album by Hash Jar Tempo, released on March 23, 1999 by Drunken Fish Records.

Track listing

Personnel 
Adapted from the Under Glass liner notes.
Hash Jar Tempo
 Joe Culver – drums
 John Gibbons – guitar
 Michael Gibbons – guitar, production
 Roy Montgomery – guitar
 Isobel Sollenberger – flute
 Clint Takeda – bass guitar

Release history

References

External links 
 Under Glass at Discogs (list of releases)

1999 albums
Hash Jar Tempo albums
Drunken Fish Records albums